The Isabela River is a river of the Dominican Republic.

See also
List of rivers of the Dominican Republic

References
 The Columbia Gazetteer of North America. 2000.
 GEOnet Names Server
CIA map

Rivers of the Dominican Republic
Venues of the 2003 Pan American Games